is a 2016 Japanese kaiju film directed by Minoru Kawasaki.

Plot 

A giant monster appears out of Mt. Myojin, which erupted for the first time in 250 years. The Japanese government, which retains no possible way to do it, saves the scientist Dr. Saigo and his daughter Miwa of the Institute of Super Physics and Chemistry, who were once ousted from the academic society on suspicion of forging the universal cell "Setap X". Ask. The universal cell Setap X has already been completed. Dr. Saigo injects Setup X into his executive assistant, Yoide Nitta. Nitta grows into a giant Nitta with a height of 40 meters and challenges a gigantic monster!

Cast 
 Kota Ibushi as Hideto Nitta (after Injection)
 Syuusuke Saito as (before Injection)
 Minoru Suzuki as Evil Nitta
 Ryu Manatsu as Professor Jotaro Saigo
 Hiroyuki Taniguchi as Daikaiju Mono
 Eiji Ukulele as Vice-Minister Shuichi Oda
 Shinzo Hotta as Professor Nindo Izumi
 Miki Kawanishi as Miwa Saigo
 Saki Akai as Lisa / Scorpio
 Fuyuki Moto
 Mitsuko Hoshi
 Eiichi Kikuchi as Deputy Defense Secretary Wataru Hashimoto
 Bin Furuya as Defense Minister Yukio Kamikura
 Sandayu Dokumamushi
 Yasuhiko Saijo

References

External links 
 Official website
 

Films directed by Minoru Kawasaki
2016 films
Kaiju films
Giant monster films
Japanese comedy films
2010s Japanese films
2010s Japanese-language films